Mahmud Mohammed  (born 10 November 1946) is a Nigerian jurist and Chief Justice of Nigeria from 2014 to 2016.

Early life
Justice Mohammed was born on November 10, 1946 in Jalingo, the capital of Taraba State, northeastern Nigeria.
He obtained a Bachelor of Law degree at Ahmadu Bello University in 1970 and was called to the Nigerian bar, the same year he graduated from the Nigerian Law School.

Law career
He joined the services of the Ministries of Justice of the defunct North-eastern state as a barrister and in 1991, he became the acting Chief judge of Taraba State, the same year his appointment was confirmed as the Chief Judge of the state.
In 2005, he was appointed to the bench of the Supreme Court of Nigeria as Justice.
In November 2014, he was appointed as the Chief Justice of Nigeria to succeed Aloma Mariam Mukhtar, the first female Justice of Nigeria.
Justice Mahmud Mohammed is currently the Chairman of the National Judicial Council.

Membership
Member, Nigerian Bar Association
Member, International Bar Association
Member, Nigerian Body of Benchers
Member, National Judicial Council

References

1946 births
Nigerian jurists
People from Taraba State
Living people
Supreme Court of Nigeria justices
Chief justices of Nigeria